The 2008 Individual Speedway Junior World Championship was the 32nd edition of the World motorcycle speedway Under-21 Championships.

The title was won by Emil Sajfutdinov from the Russia speedway team, he was the first rider to win the title twice.

Calendar

Allocation

Qualifying rounds

Semi-finals

Final 
Final
2008-10-04 (14:00 UTC+2)
 Pardubice, Svítkov Stadion
Referee: Wojciech Grodzki
Jury President: Jörgen L. Jensen
Change:
(7)  Adrian Gomólski → Vaculík

Heat after heat:
 Batchelor, Saifutdinov, Zengota, Sitera
 Hougaard, Vaculík, Lindgren, Bridger
 Holder, Pavlic, Karpow, Kus
 Kononow, Risager, Lawson, Gustafsson (Woffinden - T)
 Pavlic, Hougaard, Risager, Sitera
 Kus, Woffinden, Bridger, Zengota
 Saifutdinov, Karpow, Kononow, Vaculík
 Holder, Batchelor, Lawson, Lindgren
 Bridger, Sitera, Lawson, Karpow
 Holder, Zengota, Hougaard, Kononow
 Saifutdinov, Lindgren, Pavlic, Woffinden
 Vaculík, Risager, Batchelor, Kus
 Vaculík, Holder, Woffinden, Sitera
 Zengota, Lindgren, Risager, Karpow
 Saifutdinov, Kus, Lawson, Hougaard
 Pavlic, Batchelor, Kononow, Bridger
 Kus, Lindgren, Kononow, Sitera (e4)
 Pavlic, Zengota, Vaculík, Lawson
 Saifutdinov, Bridger, Holder, Risager
 Batchelor, Hougaard, Karpow, Woffinden
 Silver medal Run-Off:
 Holder, Pavlic

References 
pzm.pl - FIM Calendar 2008
pzm.pl - Allocation 

2008
World Individual Junior
2008 in Czech sport
Speedway competitions in the Czech Republic